John Fitzalan, 3rd Lord of Clun and Oswestry (1200–1240) in the Welsh Marches in the county of Shropshire.

Family
John succeeded his brother, William Fitz Alan, 2nd Lord of Oswestry and Clun, who died in 1215 without issue. They were sons of William Fitz Alan, 1st Lord of Oswestry and Clun (died c. 1210) and a daughter of Hugh de Lacy, name unknown; The FitzAlans were descendants of Alan fitzFlaad, a Breton.

Royal conflicts
He was one of the feudal barons who became a target for the anger of King John of England, whose forces attacked Oswestry town and burned it in 1216. John FitzAlan was close to Llywelyn ap Iorwerth until 1217.

He was also a representative of the Crown in a dispute between King Henry III of England and the Welsh leader, Llywelyn the Great in 1226. In the same year he mediated between a neighbour, William Pantulf (died 1233), Lord of Wem in Shropshire and Madog ap Gruffydd (died 1236), Lord of Powys and a cousin to Llywelyn ap Iorwerth.

In 1233/4 during the conflict between King Henry III, the Earl Marshal, and Llywelyn the Great, John FitzAlan sided firmly with the Crown and Oswestry was again attacked, this time by Welsh forces.

Marriage
He married Isabel d'Aubigny, daughter of William d'Aubigny, 3rd Earl of Arundel and Mabel of Chester, and they were parents of:

John Fitzalan, Lord of Clun & Oswestry, and Arundel, whose grandson became Earl of Arundel.

Notes

References
 Dictionary of National Biography, Volumes 1-20, 22.  Page 103
 Weis, Frederick Lewis, Ancestral Roots of Certain American Colonists Who Came to America Before 1700 p. 149-28.
 D.C. Roberts Some Aspects of the History of the Lordship of Oswestry, Thesis in the National Library of Wales.

1200 births
1240 deaths
John
Jure uxoris officeholders
People from Oswestry